"TwentyFourSeven" is a song by UK garage duo Artful Dodger featuring All Saints member Melanie Blatt. The version that is included on their debut studio album, It's All About the Stragglers, features another All Saints member, Nicole Appleton, instead of Blatt. Released on 3 September 2001, the song peaked at number six on the UK Singles Chart. Since it was recorded just before the split of All Saints, it was decided to include this song on the All Hits album as well.

Artful Dodger initially consisted of Mark Hill and Pete Devereux, but Devereux left prior to the release of the single "TwentyFourSeven", making this the first single of Artful Dodger as a stage name for Mark Hill.

Music video
The music video for "TwentyFourSeven", directed by Jamie Morgan, has a springtime feel about it with Melanie Blatt sitting in a rattan chair with a dog.

Track listings

UK CD1
 "TwentyFourSeven" (radio version)
 "TwentyFourSeven" (Grant Nelson Remix)
 "TwentyFourSeven" (Another Dub-A-Holics Injection Dub featuring Miss Shorte-E)
 "TwentyFourSeven" (video)

UK CD2
 "TwentyFourSeven" (Another Dub-A-Holics Injection Vocal featuring Miss Shorte-E)
 "TwentyFourSeven" (Pale Face Mix)
 "TwentyFourSeven" (behind the scenes footage)

UK cassette single
 "TwentyFourSeven" (radio version)
 "TwentyFourSeven" (Grant Nelson Remix)

European CD single
 "TwentyFourSeven" (radio version) – 3:48
 "TwentyFourSeven" (Another Dub-A-Holics Injection Dub featuring Miss Shorte-E) – 7:27

Australian CD single
 "TwentyFourSeven" (radio version)
 "TwentyFourSeven" (Grant Nelson Remix)
 "TwentyFourSeven" (Another Dub-A-Holics Injection Dub featuring Miss Shorte-E)

Charts

Weekly charts

Year-end charts

References

External links
 Official Artful Dodger site

2000 songs
2001 singles
Artful Dodger (duo) songs
Melanie Blatt songs
FFRR Records singles
Songs written by Michelle Escoffery
Songs written by Mark Hill (musician)